An attack on the Saudi embassy in Khartoum took place on 1 March 1973. It was carried out by the Black September Organization. Ten diplomats were taken hostage. After President Richard Nixon stated that he refused to negotiate with terrorists, and insisted that "no concessions" would be made, the three Western hostages were killed.

Attack
On March 1, 1973, the Saudi embassy in Khartoum was giving a formal reception, and George Curtis Moore, chargé d'affaires at the American embassy, was the guest of honor as he was due to be reassigned from his post. Palestinian gunmen burst into the embassy, and took Moore hostage, as well as fellow American Cleo Allen Noel, a Belgian diplomat, and two others.

Eight masked men from Black September entered the building and fired shots in the air, detaining ten hostages:
Cleo A. Noel Jr., the US Ambassador to Sudan
Sheikh Abdullah al Malhouk, the Saudi Arabian Ambassador to Sudan, and his wife and their four children
George Curtis Moore, US Deputy Chief of Mission to Sudan
Guy Eid, Belgian Chargé d'affaires to Sudan
Adli al Nasser, Jordanian Chargé d'affaires to Sudan

The morning after the hostages had been taken, the gunmen demanded the release of numerous Palestinians held in Israeli prisons, as well as the release of members of the Baader-Meinhof Group, and the release of Sirhan Sirhan. However, they revised their demands and insisted that ninety Arab militants being held by the Jordanian government must be freed within 24 hours or the hostages would be killed.

In a news conference on March 2, President Richard Nixon stated that the United States would "not pay blackmail". American negotiators seemed confused as to how to best respond to the hostage-takers' demands, and Nixon seemed to believe that the gunmen would give themselves up in exchange for safe passage as others had done when storming the Israeli embassy in Bangkok a year earlier.

After twelve hours, the gunmen stated that they had killed Noel, Moore and Eid, the three Western diplomats in their custody. They demanded a plane to take them and their hostages to the United States, which was rejected by both the Sudanese and American governments.

The Sudanese government continued to negotiate with the militants, and after three days the gunmen released the remaining hostages and surrendered to Sudanese authorities. In the aftermath it was found that the three deceased diplomats had been taken to the basement and killed.

Aftermath
In October 1973, charges against two of the militants were dropped for insufficient evidence. A court of inquiry commenced trying the remaining six in June 1974. The court sentenced the six to life imprisonment before their sentences were reduced to seven years. The US government unsuccessfully lobbied the Sudanese government to put them to death.

Sudanese President Gaafar Nimeiry was on an official trip abroad during the incident and condemned it in the strongest terms on his return, stating that the perpetrators rewarded Sudan, which had provided peaceful sanctuary to Palestinian refugees, with the disturbance of Sudan's internal peace. He decided to delegate the punishment of the perpetrators to their compatriots and handed the six to the custody of the Palestine Liberation Organization. The next day, the PLO sent the six to Egypt, where they were to serve their sentences. In protest of Sudan's handling of this situation, the United States withdrew its ambassador to Sudan and froze economic assistance to Sudan in June. A new US ambassador returned to Sudan in November that year, and aid resumed in 1976.

Three of the Black September militants disappeared from Egyptian custody and were never recaptured. The remaining three served out their sentences.

The United States also tried to prosecute Yasser Arafat in the United States for his role in the event. However, John R. Bolton, then Assistant Attorney General at the Department of Justice, in 1986 concluded that they lacked the legal jurisdiction for trying Arafat, as the appropriate statutory laws were not yet in force in 1973.

In December 2006, the United States Department of State released documents claiming that Arafat and the Fatah party were aware of the plot before it was carried out, and had ordered the operation. The documents further alleged that US intelligence had sent a warning to the embassy beforehand, but it was not intercepted in time.

See also
 John Granville
 Saudi Arabia–Sudan relations

References

References
Blumenau, Bernhard. The United Nations and Terrorism. Germany, Multilateralism, and Antiterrorism Efforts in the 1970s Palgrave Macmillan, 2014, ch. 2. .

External links
 American Ambassador Captured By Guerrillas - published on the Herald-Journal on March 2, 1973
 Us Envoys Seized Terrorists Want Sirhan Set Free - published on the Montreal Gazette on March 2, 1973
 Palestinian Guerrillas Murder Three, Hold Two - published on the Evening Independent on March 3, 1973
 Terrorists In Khartoum Surrender, Free Hostages - published on the Herald-Journal on March 5, 1973
 Sudan Killings: The Last 25 Minutes - published on the New Straits Times on March 6, 1973
 BBC this day in history - 1 March 1973

1973 in international relations
1973 in Sudan
1973 in Saudi Arabia
1973 murders in Sudan
Attacks on buildings and structures in 1973
March 1973 events in Africa
History of Khartoum
20th century in Khartoum
Military history of Sudan
Hostage taking in Sudan
Terrorist incidents in Africa in 1973
Sudan
Terrorist attacks attributed to Palestinian militant groups
Saudi Arabia
Terrorist incidents in Sudan in the 1970s
Black September Organization
Presidency of Richard Nixon
Belgium–Sudan relations
Belgium–Saudi Arabia relations
Belgium–United States relations
Saudi Arabia–Sudan relations
Saudi Arabia–United States relations
Sudan–United States relations